The monuments in the Gagra Municipality is a group of cultural heritage sites registered by the government of Georgia on the territory of a de jure territorial unit, which corresponds to the Gagra District in northwestern Abkhazia.

The table lists a monument, its location and dating as well as the status attached to it by the Georgian authorities and the number assigned in the registry by the National Agency for Cultural Heritage Preservation of Georgia, which is available online as a GIS portal. The Agency broadly classifies the heritage sites into three groups: 1) the objects without a status, 2) immovable monuments of cultural heritage, and 3) immovable monuments of national significance.

Notes

References

See also
 List of Cultural Heritage Monuments of Georgia

Gagra